Kalaikkal Kumaran (1919 - 8 August 1998) was a noted Malayalam film and very popular drama actor. He was well known for his comedy roles in dramas by Kalidasa Kalakendram. He acted in 65 films and more than 150 dramas. He appeared more than 15000 stages. His first drama was Kathirukanakili by Kerala theatre of Ponkunnam Varkey. Other famous dramas are Doctor, Kathirukanakili, Althara, Muthuchippi, Kadalpalam, Swantham Lekhakan, Yudhabhoomi and Samgamam, more than 150 dramas. He received many Kerala state awards, including Kerala Sangeetha Nataka Akademi Fellowship for acting in 1989. Kumaran was a member of Kerala Sangeetha Nataka Akademi. Kalaikkal Kumaran was supposed to create a record for appearing on more than 20,000 stages, but he lost his vision due to cataracts and left the field. Kalaikkal Kumaran was a staunch atheist throughout his life, and was a supporter of Communist Party of India

Personal life
With his wife, he had six children, one of whom is deceased.

Children
 Ramani D.
 Renjini Ashokan
 Sobhana C.
 Mala Sukumaran (School of Drama and Fine Arts (1979-83 BTA Batch))
 Shanavas (deceased)
 Sheela Suguthan

Movies 
 Rakthabandham (1951)
 Viyarppinte Vila (1962)
 Kerala Kesari (1951)
 Lokaneethi (1953)
 Avan Varunnu (1954)
 Kidappaadam (1955)
 Achanum Makanum (1957)
 Arappavan (1961)
 Kalayum Kaaminiyum (1963)
 Bhoomiyile Maalakha (1965)
 Odayil Ninnu (1965)
 Kaattu Pookkal (1965)
 Shakunthala (1965)
 Punnapra Vayalar (1968)
 Kodungallooramma (1968)
 Chattambi Kavala (1969)
 Postmane Kanmanilla (1972)
 Nithyavasantham  (1979)
He concentrated more on dramas of Kalidasa kalakendram.

Awards 
Kumaran received many awards, including: 
 Kerala Sangeetha Nataka Akademi Award in 1978
 Kerala Sangeetha Nataka Akademi Fellowship in 1989
 Kerala state award for contribution to drama in 1993
 Kerala state film award for contribution to film industry in 1997

Death 

Kalaikkal Kumaran died on August 8 1998.

See also
Odayil Ninnu

References

External links
http://www.filmlinks4u.to/2012/07/arappavan-1961-malayalam-movie-watch-online.html
http://en.msidb.org/displayProfile.php?category=actors&artist=Kalaikkal%20Kumara

1919 births
1998 deaths
Indian male film actors
People from Vaikom
Male actors in Malayalam cinema
Male actors from Kerala
20th-century Indian male actors
Date of birth missing
Indian male stage actors
Male actors in Malayalam theatre
Recipients of the Kerala Sangeetha Nataka Akademi Fellowship
Recipients of the Kerala Sangeetha Nataka Akademi Award